The red-capped robin-chat or Natal robin (Cossypha natalensis) is a species of bird in the family Muscicapidae.

It is found in Angola, Botswana, Burundi, Cameroon, Central African Republic, Republic of the Congo, Democratic Republic of the Congo, Eswatini, Ethiopia, Gabon, Kenya, Malawi, Mozambique, Namibia, Nigeria, Rwanda, Somalia, South Africa, South Sudan, Tanzania, Uganda, Zambia, and Zimbabwe.

Description 

It is mostly orange-brown with slate-grey wings and darker tail. Its natural habitat is subtropical or tropical dry forests.

References

External links
 Natal robin/red-capped robin-chat - Species text in The Atlas of Southern African Birds.

red-capped robin-chat
Birds of Sub-Saharan Africa
red-capped robin-chat
Taxonomy articles created by Polbot